The alpha max plus beta min algorithm is a high-speed approximation of the square root of the sum of two squares. The square root of the sum of two squares, also known as Pythagorean addition, is a useful function, because it finds the hypotenuse of a right triangle given the two side lengths, the norm of a 2-D vector, or the magnitude  of a complex number  given the real and imaginary parts.

The algorithm avoids performing the square and square-root operations, instead using simple operations such as comparison, multiplication, and addition. Some choices of the α and β parameters of the algorithm allow the multiplication operation to be reduced to a simple shift of binary digits that is particularly well suited to implementation in high-speed digital circuitry.

The approximation is expressed as

Improvements
This can be remedied by replacing the result with  whenever that is greater, essentially splitting the line into two different segments.

 

Depending on the hardware, this improvement can be almost free.

Using this improvement changes which parameter values are optimal, because they no longer need a close match for the entire interval. A lower  and higher  can therefore increase precision further.

 
 
 

Beware however, that a non-zero  would require at least one extra addition and some bit-shifts (or a multiplication), probably nearly doubling the cost and, depending on the hardware, possibly defeat the purpose of using an approximation in the first place.

See also
Hypot, a precise function or algorithm that is also safe against overflow and underflow.

References
Lyons, Richard G. Understanding Digital Signal Processing, section 13.2. Prentice Hall, 2004 .
Griffin, Grant. DSP Trick: Magnitude Estimator.

External links

Approximation algorithms
Root-finding algorithms
Pythagorean theorem